The Story of Sin is a 1975 Polish drama film directed by Walerian Borowczyk based on the novel Dzieje grzechu by Stefan Żeromski. It was entered into the 1975 Cannes Film Festival.

Cast
 Grażyna Długołęcka as Ewa Pobratynska
 Jerzy Zelnik as Lukasz Niepolomski
 Olgierd Łukaszewicz as Count Zygmunt Szczerbic
 Roman Wilhelmi as Antoni Pochron
 Marek Walczewski as Plaza-Splawski
 Karolina Lubienska as Mrs. Pobratynska, Ewa's mother
 Zdzisław Mrożewski as Mr. Pobratynski, Ewa's father
 Mieczyslaw Voit as Count Cyprian Bodzanta
 Marek Bargielowski as Adolf Horst
 Jolanta Szemberg as Aniela
 Zbigniew Zapasiewicz as Priest Jutkiewicz
 Władysław Hańcza as Dr. Wielgosinski
 Jadwiga Chojnacka as Leoska, servant
 Bogusław Sochnacki
 Janusz Zakrzeński as Editor of 'Tygodnik Naukowy'

References

External links

1975 films
1970s Polish-language films
1975 drama films
Films based on Polish novels
Films based on works by Stefan Żeromski
Films directed by Walerian Borowczyk
Polish drama films